Laxmangarh  is a town in Sikar district of Rajasthan state in India.

History
Laxmangarh was founded by Rao Raja Lakshman Singh of Sikar,  in 1805. He also built a fort there now called Laxmangarh Fort.

Geography
It has an average elevation of 222 metres (728 ft).

References

External links

Sikar district

Cities and towns in Sikar district
Populated places established in 1864